Al-Hassar or Abu Bakr Muhammad ibn Abdallah ibn Ayyash al-Hassar was a 12th-century Moroccan mathematician. He is the author of two books Kitab al-bayan wat-tadhkar (Book of Demonstration and Memorization), a manual of calculation and Kitab al-kamil fi sinaat al-adad (Complete Book on the Art of Numbers), on the breakdown of numbers. The first book is lost and only a part of the second book remains.

Al-Hassar developed the modern symbolic mathematical notation for fractions, where the numerator and denominator are separated by a horizontal bar. This same fractional notation appeared soon after in the work of Fibonacci in the 13th century.

References

Further reading
Suter, Heinrich, Beitraege zur Geschichte der Mathematik und Astronomie im Islam. Nachdruck seiner Schriften aus den Jahren 1892-1922. [Contributions to the history of mathematics and astronomy in Islam. Reprint of his works from the years 1892-1922]. Hrsg. von Fuat Sezgin. Baende 1 und 2. [Ed. by Fuat Sezgin. Volumes 1 and 2] Veroeffentlichungen des Institutes fuer Geschichte der Arabisch-Islamischen Wissenschaften. Reihe B: Nachdrucke, Abteilung Mathematik, Bd. 1 [Publications of the Institute for the History of Arabic-Islamic Sciences. Series B: Section Mathematics, vol. 1] Frankfurt am Main: Institut fuer Geschichte der Arabisch- Islamischen Wissenschaften an der Johann Wolfgang Goethe-Universitaet, 1986. Band I: xiii, 761 S.; Band II: x, 724 S.

External links
Prof. Paul Kunitzsch, Al-Hassâr's Kitâb al-Bayân and the Transmission of the Hindu-Arabic Numerals  retrieved 01-09-2010)
Manuscript of Kitâb al-bayân wa-l-tadhkâr, online by Library of the University of Pennsylvania, Philadelphia  (retrieved 01-09-2010)

Medieval Moroccan mathematicians
12th-century mathematicians
Moroccan writers
Year of death unknown
Year of birth missing
12th-century Moroccan writers